The term "gauge" is used in knitting to describe the fineness size of knitting machines. It is used in both hand knitting and machine knitting. The phrase in both instances refers to the number of stitches per inch rather than the size of the finished article of clothing. The gauge is calculated by counting the stitches (for hand knitting) or needles (on a knitting machine bed) across a number of inches, then dividing by the sample's width in inches.

Gauge on knitting machines

There are two types of classification of Knitting Gauges or Unit of Measure: 
A – Used for Cotton Fully fashion flat machines (Bentley – Monk, Textima, Sheller etc..) where “Gauge” is measured in 1,5” Inches (2,54 cm x 1,5) and the machine's gauge is expressed by the number of needles needed to achieve that gauge. 
B – Used for hand, mechanical or modern Electronic Flat Machines (Stoll, Shima, Protti etc..), where gauge is measured in 1 inch increments (or 2,5 cm) and the machine's gauge is similarly measured by the number of needles required to achieve that number.

Compared graduation scale Gauge (GG) A versus B system:
A 30 GG (A) Cotton Fully fashion flat machine (30 needles in 1,5”) is comparable to a 20 GG (B) Electronic Flat machine, a 27 GG (A) is an 18 GG (B), an 18 GG (A) is a 12 GG (B), a 12 GG (A) is an 8 GG (B), a 7,5 GG (A) is a 5 GG (B) and a 4,5 GG (A) is a 3 GG (B).

Factors that affect knitting gauge

The gauge of a knitted fabric depends on the pattern of stitches in the fabric, the kind of yarn, the size of knitting needles, and the tension of the individual knitter (i.e., how much yarn they allow between stitches).

 For example, ribbing and cable patterns tend to "pull in," giving more stitches over an identical width than stockinette, garter, or seed stitch.  Even the same stitch produced in two different ways may produce a different gauge.
 Thicker yarns with less loft generally produce larger stitches than thinner yarns (reducing the number of stitches per width and length).
 Larger knitting needles also produce larger stitches, giving fewer stitches and rows per inch. Changing needle size is the best way to control one's own gauge for a given pattern and yarn.
 Finally, the knitter's tension, or how tightly one knits, can affect the gauge significantly.  The gauge can even vary within a single garment, typically with beginning knitters; as knitters become more familiar with a stitch pattern, they become more relaxed and make the stitch differently, producing a different gauge.

Sometimes the gauge is deliberately altered within a garment, usually by changing needle size; for example, smaller stitches are often made at the collar, sleeve cuffs, hemline ribbing or pocket edges.

Uneven knitting
Uneven knitting is a knitting technique in which two knitting needles of different sizes are used.   The method is sometimes used when the knitter has a significantly different gauge on knit and purl stitches.  It is also useful for producing elongated stitches and certain specialty patterns.

Knitting gauge in patterns

To produce a knitted garment of given dimensions, whether from one's own design or from a published pattern, the gauge should match as closely as possible; significant differences in gauge will lead to a deformed garment.  Patterns for knitting projects almost always include a suggested gauge for the project.

For illustration, suppose that a sweater is designed to measure 40" around the bustline with a gauge of 5 st/inch in the chosen stitch.  Therefore, the pattern should call for 200 stitches (5 st/inch x 40") at the bustline.  If the knitter follows the pattern with a gauge of 4 st/inch, the sweater will measure 50" around the bustline (200 st / 4st/in) -- too baggy!  Conversely, if the knitter follows the pattern with a gauge of 6 st/inch, the sweater will measure ~33" around the bustline (200 st / 6st/inch) -- too tight!  Generally, the gauge should match to better than 5%, corresponding to 1" of ease in a 20" width.  Similar concerns apply to the number of rows per inch.

Luckily, the gauge can be adjusted by changing needle size, without changing the pattern, stitch, yarn, or habits of the knitter.  Larger needles produce a smaller gauge (fewer stitches per inch) and smaller needles produce a larger gauge (more stitches per inch).  If necessary, further adjustments can be made by subtly altering the pattern dimensions, e.g., shortening a vertically aligned pattern.  Ribbing can also be used to "draw in" the fabric to the proper gauge.

Measuring knitting gauge

To check one's gauge before starting a project, a sample of knitting (a swatch) is made, ideally in the stitch pattern used in the garment.   The swatch edges affect the reading of the gauge, so it is best that the swatch be at least 4" square and more safely 6–8" square.  Dividing the number of stitches used by the actual size of the sample gives the stitch gauge of that sample.  Similarly, the row gauge is calculated by dividing the number of rows knitted by the length of the sample.  Making a swatch also helps familiarize the knitter with the stitch pattern and yarn, which will lead to a more uniform gauge in the final garment.

References
 June Hemmons Hiatt (1988) The Principles of Knitting, Simon and Schuster, pp. 415–432.

External links

 knitty.com article on gauge
 Measuring Gauge
 Needle Conversion Chart Shows conversion between current and past US and European knitting needle sizes.
 Yarn Weight and Gauge Chart Recommended needle and crochet hook sizes used to achieve gauge with various yarns.

Knitting methods for shaping